The El Morocco was a club at 1322 North E. Street on the West Side of Las Vegas, Nevada.

History 
It was opened in 1945 by Frank Wilson, who operated it as a bar with slot machines. Around 1948 it was closed briefly, possibly for hosting an interracial clientele, but soon reopened adding blackjack, craps and poker tables.  In 1954, the crap dealer was Calvin Washington and Clarence Ray was the night manager. 

The original business was destroyed by fire in 1955, but in 1957 when Sarann Knight-Preddy returned from Hawthorne, Nevada, where she had run the first club licensed to a black woman she went to work at the rebuilt El Morocco. The new owner ran the business from 1957 to 1958, but then it closed and the building was razed two years later due to vandalism which caused its condemnation by the city.

New El Morocco 
In 1959, the New El Morocco was built on the same site and opened on March 11. Oscar Crozier, one of the liaisons between the casino owners on the Las Vegas Strip and the National Association for the Advancement of Colored People (NAACP) was one of the new owners. He was unable to make a go of the business and it folded on February 9, 1960, before its first anniversary. Val Ruggerio reopened the New El Morocco on October 2, 1963, and was licensed for blackjack, craps, poker and slot machines. Ruggerio moved to Reno and closed the business on April 28, 1964.

References

Sources

Defunct nightclubs in the Las Vegas Valley
1945 establishments in Nevada
1958 disestablishments in Nevada
Defunct casinos in the Las Vegas Valley
West Las Vegas